David Allen Jensen (born August 19, 1965) is an American former professional ice hockey player. He appeared in 105 National Hockey League regular season games between 1984 and 1990.

Biography
Jensen was born in Needham, Massachusetts, and raised in Needham, Massachusetts. As a youth, he played in the 1978 Quebec International Pee-Wee Hockey Tournament with a minor ice hockey team from Boston.

Jensen entered Belmont Hill as a Freshman and transferred to Lawrence Academy his Junior year graduating in 1984.

Was the first Junior in High School to be selected in the First Round of the 1983 June NHL Entry Draft (20th Overall) as a 17-year-old by Hartford Whalers.

Jensen played with the U.S. National Team in 1983–84 as an amateur and was a member of the Olympic team that played in the 1984 Winter Olympic Games in Sarajevo.

Career statistics

Regular season and playoffs

International

References

External links

Profile at hockeydraftcentral.com

1965 births
Living people
American men's ice hockey forwards
Binghamton Whalers players
Hartford Whalers draft picks
Hartford Whalers players
Ice hockey players from Massachusetts
Ice hockey players at the 1984 Winter Olympics
Maine Mariners players
National Hockey League first-round draft picks
Olympic ice hockey players of the United States
Sportspeople from Needham, Massachusetts
Sportspeople from Newton, Massachusetts
Washington Capitals players